Bang Si Mueang is one of the ten subdistricts (tambon) of Mueang Nonthaburi District, in Nonthaburi Province, Thailand. Neighbouring subdistricts are (from north clockwise) Sai Ma, Suan Yai (across the Chao Phraya River), Bang Phai, Bang Si Thong and Bang Krang. In 2020 it had a total population of 24,718 people.

Administration

Central administration
The subdistrict is subdivided into 5 villages (muban).

Local administration
The whole area of the subdistrict is covered by Bang Si Mueang Town Municipality.

References

External links
Website of Bang Si Mueang Town Municipality

Tambon of Nonthaburi province
Populated places in Nonthaburi province